The 195th Pennsylvania House of Representatives District is located in Philadelphia County and includes the following areas:

 Ward 15
 Ward 24 [PART, Divisions 01, 02, 03, 04, 05, 09, 10, 11, 12, 13, 14, 15, 18 and 19]
 Ward 28
 Ward 29
 Ward 32 [PART, Divisions 01, 02, 03, 04, 10, 13, 14, 15, 16, 17, 18, 19, 20, 21, 22, 23, 24, 25, 26, 27, 28, 29, 30 and 31]

Representatives

References

Government of Philadelphia
195